Light of Mine is the debut studio album by American rapper and singer Kyle. It was released on May 18, 2018 by Independently Popular and Atlantic Records. The album features guest appearances from Kehlani, 2 Chainz, Sophia Black, Khalid, Take 6, Avery Wilson, Lil Yachty and Alessia Cara. The album was supported by four singles; "iSpy", "To the Moon", "Playinwitme" and “Ikuyo". A deluxe version of the album was released on August 23, 2019. It features three previously released singles: "Moment" featuring Wiz Khalifa, "SuperDuperKyle" featuring MadeinTYO, "Hey Julie!" featuring Lil Yachty, and most recently released single "F You I Love You" featuring Teyana Taylor, along with two new songs.

Artwork
The cover art was designed by SuperDuperBrick and James McCloud, who previously collaborated on the art for Kehlani’s debut album SweetSexySavage.

Critical reception

Light of Mine received favorable positive reviews from music critics. At Album of the Year, which assigns a normalized rating out of 100 to reviews from mainstream critics, the album received an average score of 75 based on five reviews.

In his review for Highsnobiety, Russell Dean Stone wrote that "At best, you could say that Light of Mine is optimism as cultural rebellion – at worst, it plays things too safe in an attempt to be liked by everyone (in Kyle’s defense, at least it doesn’t feel he’s ever trying to be anything he’s not)". In Vice, Robert Christgau summed it up as the "best innocent act in r&b, with girlish female cameos nailing two fetching numbers", naming "Ikuyo" and "Games" as highlights.

Commercial performance
Light of Mine debuted at number 29 on the Billboard 200, selling 17,000 album-equivalent units and 2,000 pure album sales in its first week. The album was certified gold by the Recording Industry Association of America (RIAA) for combined sales and album-equivalent units of over 500,000 copies in the United States. It was also certified gold in Canada.

Track listing

 Sample credits
 "Ups & Downs" contains an interpolation of "Just What I Am", as performed by Kid Cudi featuring King Chip.

Charts

Certifications

Release history

References

2018 debut albums
Kyle (musician) albums
Atlantic Records albums